Arthur Hohl (May 21, 1889 – March 10, 1964) was an American stage and motion-picture character actor. He was born in Pittsburgh, Pennsylvania and began appearing in films in the early 1920s. He played a great number of villainous or mildly larcenous roles, although his screen roles usually were small, but he also played a few sympathetic characters.

Hohl's two performances seen most often today are as Pete, the nasty boat engineer who tells the local sheriff about Julie (Helen Morgan) and her husband (Donald Cook)'s secret interracial marriage in Show Boat (1936),  and as Mr. Montgomery, the man who helps Richard Arlen and Leila Hyams to make their final escape in Island of Lost Souls (1932). He also played Brutus  opposite Warren William's Julius Caesar in Cecil B. DeMille's version of Cleopatra (1934), starring Claudette Colbert.

Among his other notable roles were as Olivier, King Louis XI's right-hand man, in The Hunchback of Notre Dame (1939), as the real estate agent in Charlie Chaplin's Monsieur Verdoux (1947), and as Journet, a bereaved innkeeper who seeks to avenge his daughter's murder in the Basil Rathbone Sherlock Holmes film The Scarlet Claw (1944). Hohl also played a Christian named Titus (no relation to Titus Andronicus) in Cecil B. DeMille's religious epic The Sign of the Cross (1932).

Many sources claim that Hohl played a monk in the 1943 film classic The Song of Bernadette, but he is nowhere to be seen in the finished film.

Hohl also appeared on the Broadway stage in plays by William Shakespeare, George Bernard Shaw, and Henrik Ibsen. Some of his stage roles, such as Sir Andrew Aguecheek in a 1930 Broadway revival of Twelfth Night, were considerably larger than his film roles.

Hohl married Jessie E. Gray in 1920, who survived him when he died in 1964. The couple had no children.

Filmography

 Wolfe and Montcalm (1924) as Gen. James Wolfe
 The Puritans (1924)
 It Is the Law (1924) as Albert Woodruff / Sniffer
 The Cheat (1931) as Defense Attorney (uncredited)
 The Night of June 13 (1932) as Prosecuting Attorney
 The Sign of the Cross (1932) as Titus
 Island of Lost Souls (1932) as Montgomery
 The Crime of the Century (1933) as Announcer (uncredited)
 Infernal Machine (1933) as Ship's Captain
 The Life of Jimmy Dolan (1933) as Herman Malvin
 The Silk Express (1933) as Wallace Myton
 Private Detective 62 (1933) as Hogan
 The Narrow Corner (1933) as Captain Nichols
 Baby Face (1933) as Ed Sipple
 Captured! (1933) as Cocky
 Brief Moment (1933) as Steve Walsh
 Wild Boys of the Road (1933) as Dr. Heckel
 Footlight Parade (1933) as Frazer
 The Kennel Murder Case (1933) as Gamble - the Butler
 Man's Castle (1933) as Bragg
 College Coach (1933) as Seymour Young
 The World Changes (1933) as Mr. Patten
 Massacre (1934) as Dr. Turner
 As the Earth Turns (1934) as George
 Jimmy the Gent (1934) as Joe
 A Modern Hero (1934) as Homer Flint
 The Defense Rests (1934) as James Randolph
 Bulldog Drummond Strikes Back (1934) as Dr. Sothern
 Girl in Danger (1934) as Albert Beckett
 Among the Missing (1934) as Gordon
 Cleopatra (1934) as Brutus
 Lady by Choice (1934) as Kendall
 Against the Law (1934) as Kelly
 Jealousy (1934) as Mike Callahan
 Romance in Manhattan (1935) as Halsey J. Pander
 The Whole Town's Talking (1935) as Detective Sergeant Boyle
 In Spite of Danger (1935) as Steve Lynch
 I'll Love You Always (1935) as Jergens
 Eight Bells (1935) as Williams
 One Frightened Night (1935) as Arthur Proctor
 Village Tale (1935) as Elmer Stevenson
 Unknown Woman (1935) as Lansing
 After the Dance (1935) as Louie
 Atlantic Adventure (1935) as Frank Julian
 Case of the Missing Man (1935) as Steve
 Guard That Girl (1935) as Reynolds
 Super-Speed (1935) as Philip Morton
 We're Only Human (1935) as Conroy (uncredited)
 If You Could Only Cook (1935) as Lawyer John Martin
 The Lone Wolf Returns (1935) as Undetermined Supporting Role (scenes deleted)
 It Had to Happen (1936) as Honest John Pelkey
 Show Boat (1936) as Pete
 Forgotten Faces (1936) as Hi-Jack Eddie
 The Devil-Doll (1936) as Victor Radin
 Lloyd's of London (1936) as First Captain
 The Road Back (1937) as Heinrich
 Slave Ship (1937) as Grimes
 Mountain Music (1937) as Prosecuting Attorney (uncredited)
 Trapped by G-Men (1937) as Henchman Blackie
 Hot Water (1937) as Walter Whittaker
 The Bad Man of Brimstone (1937) as 'Doc' Laramie
 Penitentiary (1938) as Finch (uncredited)
 Kidnapped (1938) as Riach
 Crime Takes a Holiday (1938) as Joe Whitehead
 Stablemates (1938) as Mr. Gale
 Boy Slaves (1939) as Sheriff
 You Can't Cheat an Honest Man (1939) as Burr
 Help Wanted (1939) as Graham - Head of Employment Agency (uncredited)
 They Shall Have Music (1939) as Miller
 Fugitive at Large (1939) as Curtis
 The Adventures of Sherlock Holmes (1939) as Bassick
 Blackmail (1939) as Rawlins
 Two Thoroughbreds (1939) as Thaddeus Carey
 The Hunchback of Notre Dame (1939) as Olivier
 20 Mule Team (1940) as Salters
 Blondie Has Servant Trouble (1940) as Eric Vaughn
 Men of Boys Town (1941) as Guard
 Ride on Vaquero (1941) as Sheriff Johnny Burns
 We Go Fast (1941) as Hold-Up Man
 Son of Fury: The Story of Benjamin Blake (1942) as Captain Greenough
 Moontide (1942) as Jennings
 Whispering Ghosts (1942) as Inspector Norris
 City Without Men (1943) as Convict (uncredited)
 Idaho (1943) as Spike Madagan
 The Woman of the Town (1943) as Robert Wright
 The Spider Woman (1944) as Adam Gilflower
 The Scarlet Claw (1944) as Emile Journet
 The Eve of St. Mark (1944) as Sheep-Wagon Driver (uncredited)
 Shadows in the Night (1944) as Riggs (uncredited)
 Irish Eyes Are Smiling (1944) as Barker (uncredited)
 Mystery of the River Boat (1944) as Clayton
 Salome, Where She Danced (1945) as Bartender
 The Thin Man Goes Home (1945)
 The Frozen Ghost (1945) as Skeptic
 Love Letters (1945) as Jupp (uncredited)
 Our Vines Have Tender Grapes (1945) sa Dvar Svenson (uncredited)
 The Yearling (1946) as Arch Forrester (uncredited)
 Monsieur Verdoux (1947) as Real Estate Agent
 It Happened on 5th Avenue (1947) as Brady - Gates Patrolman (uncredited)
 The Vigilantes Return (1947) as Sheriff
 The Three Musketeers (1948) as Dragon Rouge Host (uncredited)
 You Gotta Stay Happy (1948) as Cemetery Man
 Down to the Sea in Ships (1949) as Blair (uncredited) (final film role)

References

External links

 
 

1889 births
1964 deaths
American male silent film actors
American male film actors
Male actors from Pittsburgh
20th-century American male actors